This lists the species of birds in Mont-Tremblant National Park in Quebec, Canada. The bolded species indicate that they are threatened in the area.

Anatidae

Canada goose, Branta canadensis
Wood duck, Aix sponsa
American wigeon, Anas americana
American black duck, Anas rubripes
Mallard, Anas platyrhynchos
Ring-necked duck, Aythya collaris
Velvet scoter, Melanitta fusca
Bufflehead, Bucephala albeola
Common goldeneye, Bucephala clangula
Hooded merganser, Lophodytes cucullatus
Common merganser, Mergus merganser

Phasianidae

Ruffed grouse, Bonasa umbellus
Spruce grouse, Dendragapus canadensis

Gaviidae

Common loon, Gavia immer

Ardeidae

American bittern, Botaurus lentiginosus
Great blue heron, Ardea herodias

Cathartidae

Turkey vulture, Cathartes aura

Accipitridae

Osprey, Pandion haliaetus
Bald eagle, Haliaeetus leucocephalus
Northern harrier, Circus cyaneus
Red-shouldered hawk, Buteo lineatus
Broad-winged hawk, Buteo platypterus
Red-tailed hawk, Buteo jamaicensis
Golden eagle, Aquila chrysaetos

Falconidae

American kestrel, Falco sparverius
Merlin, Falco columbarius

Charadriidae

Killdeer, Charadrius vociferus

Scolopacidae

Solitary sandpiper, Tringa solitaria 
Spotted sandpiper, Actitis macularia
Wilson's snipe, Gallinago delicata
American woodcock, Scolopax minor

Laridae

Ring-billed gull, Larus delawarensis
Herring gull, Larus argentatus

Columbidae

Mourning dove, Zenaida macroura

Strigidae

Great horned owl, Bubo virginianus
Barred owl, Strix varia
Short-eared owl, Asio flammeus
Saw-whet owl, Aegolius acadicus

Apodidae

Chimney swift, Chaetura pelagica

Trochilidae

Ruby-throated hummingbird, Archilochus colubris

Alcedinidae

Belted kingfisher, Megaceryle alcyon

Picidae

Red-headed woodpecker, Melanerpes erythrocephalus
Yellow-bellied sapsucker, Sphyrapicus varius
Downy woodpecker, Picoides pubescens
Hairy woodpecker, Picoides villosus
Black-backed woodpecker, Picoides arcticus
Northern flicker, Colaptes auratus
Pileated woodpecker, Dryocopus pileatus

Tyrannidae

Olive-sided flycatcher, Contopus cooperi
Eastern wood-pewee, Contopus virens
Alder flycatcher, Empidonax alnorum
Least flycatcher, Empidonax minimus
Eastern phoebe, Sayornis phoebe
Eastern kingbird, Tyrannus tyrannus

Vireonidae

Blue-headed vireo, Vireo solitarius
Eastern warbling-vireo, Vireo gilvus
Philadelphia vireo, Vireo philadelphicus
Red-eyed vireo, Vireo olivaceus

Corvidae

Canada jay, Perisoreus canadensis
Blue jay, Cyanocitta cristata
American crow, Corvus brachyrhynchos
Common raven, Corvus corax

Alaudidae

Horned lark, Eremophila alpestris

Hirundinidae

Tree swallow, Tachycineta bicolor
Barn swallow, Hirundo rustica

Paridae

Black-capped chickadee, Poecile atricapillus
Boreal chickadee, Poecile hudsonicus

Sittidae

Red-breasted nuthatch, Sitta canadensis 
White-breasted nuthatch, Sitta carolinensis

Certhiidae

Brown creeper, Certhia americana

Troglodytidae

Winter wren, Troglodytes hiemalis

Regulidae

Golden-crowned kinglet, Regulus satrapa
Ruby-crowned kinglet, Regulus calendula

Turdidae

Eastern bluebird, Sialia sialis
Veery, Catharus fuscescens
Bicknell's thrush, Catharus bicknelli
Swainson's thrush, Catharus ustulatus
Hermit thrush, Catharus guttatus
American robin, Turdus migratorius

Mimidae

Grey catbird, Dumetella carolinensis

Sturnidae

Common starling, Sturnus vulgaris

Motacillidae

American pipit, Anthus rubescens

Bombycillidae

Cedar waxwing, Bombycilla cedrorum

Parulidae

Golden-winged warbler, Vermivora chrysoptera
Tennessee warbler, Oreothlypis peregrina
Nashville warbler, Oreothlypis ruficapilla 
Northern parula, Setophaga americana
Yellow warbler, Setophaga petechia
Chestnut-sided warbler, Setophaga pensylvanica
Magnolia warbler, Setophaga magnolia
Cape May warbler, Setophaga tigrina
Black-throated blue warbler, Setophaga caerulescens
Blackburnian warbler, Setophaga fusca
Bay-breasted warbler, Setophaga castanea
Blackpoll warbler, Setophaga striata
Black-and-white warbler, Mniotilta varia
American redstart, Setophaga ruticilla
Ovenbird, Seiurus aurocapillus
Northern waterthrush, Parkesia noveboracensis
Mourning warbler, Geothlypis philadelphia
Common yellowthroat, Geothlypis trichas
Canada warbler, Cardellina canadensis

Thraupidae

Scarlet tanager, Piranga olivacea

Emberizidae

American tree sparrow, Spizelloides arborea
Chipping sparrow, Spizella passerina
Fox sparrow, Passerella iliaca
Song sparrow, Melospiza melodia
Lincoln's sparrow, Melospiza lincolnii
Swamp sparrow, Melospiza georgiana
White-throated sparrow, Zonotrichia albicollis
White-crowned sparrow, Zonotrichia leucophrys 
Dark-eyed junco, Junco hyemalis
Snow bunting, Plectrophenax nivalis

Cardinalidae

Northern cardinal, Cardinalis cardinalis 
Rose-breasted grosbeak, Pheucticus ludovicianus
Indigo bunting, Passerina cyanea

Icteridae

Red-winged blackbird, Agelaius phoeniceus
Eastern meadowlark, Sturnella magna
Rusty blackbird, Euphagus carolinus
Common grackle, Quiscalus quiscula
Brown-headed cowbird, Molothrus ater

Fringillidae

Pine grosbeak, Pinicola enucleator
Purple finch, Carpodacus purpureus
White-winged crossbill, Loxia leucoptera
Common redpoll, Carduelis flammea
Pine siskin, Carduelis pinus
American goldenfinch, Carduelis tristis
Evening grosbeak, Coccothraustes vespertinus

References
 

Mont-Tremblant
Mont-Tremblant National Park
Birds
Birds